This is a list of notable people who were born or have lived in the Croatian city of Dubrovnik, ordered by century of birth and alphabetically. This includes people born in the Republic of Ragusa (1358–1808), a maritime republic corresponding to the present-day city and its surrounding area.

14th–18th century

 Francesco Maria Appendini (1768–1837), Italian priest, philologist and linguist.
 Vito Maria Bettera-Vodopić (1771–1841), military officer and politician.
 Ruđer Bošković (1711–1787), scientist, diplomat and poet.
 Marin Držić (1508–1567),  playwright and prose writer.
 Marin Getaldić (1568–1626), scientist.
 Vlaho Getaldić (1788–1872), politician and poet.
 Ivan Gundulić (1589–1638), poet.
 Ivan Rabljanin (1470–1540), technology and artist.
 Luka Radovanović (–1502), bookbinder and owner of the first printing press in Ragusa.
 Joakim Stulli (1729–1817), Franciscan, lexicographer.
 Mavro Vetranović (1482–1576), poet and writer.
 Dinko Zlatarić (1558–1613), poet and translator.
 Cvijeta Zuzorić (–), poet.
 Junije Palmotić (1606–1657), baroque writer, poet and dramatist.
 Ivan Bunić Vučić (1592–1658), politician and poet.
 Nikola Božidarević (–1517), painter.
 Nikola Božidarević (1642–1699), professor.
 Džore Držić (1461–1501), poet and playwright.
 Marin Držić (1508–1567), playwright and prose writer.
 Ignjat Đurđević (1675–1737), baroque poet, translator, historian, astronomer and Benedict monk.
 Nikola Vitov Gučetić (1549–1610), statesman, philosopher and science writer.
 Đivo Šiškov Gundulić (1678–1721), poet, dramatist and nobleman.
 Benedikt Kotruljević (1416–1469), merchant, economist, scientist, diplomat and humanist. Wrote the earliest description of double-entry bookkeeping.
 Šiško Menčetić (1457–1527), poet.
 Luka Sorkočević (1734–1789), composer.
 Dinko Zlatarić (1558–1613), poet and translator.

19th century

 Lujo Adamović (1864–1935), Croatian botanist.
 Matija Ban (1818–1903), poet, dramatist, and playwright.
 Blagoje Bersa (1873–1934), Croatian musician.
 Pero Budmani (1835–1914), Croatian linguist.
 Vlaho Bukovac (1855–1922), Croatian painter.
 Jelena Dorotka (1876-1965), Croatian painter.
 Antun Fabris (1864–1904), journalist and politician.
 Frano Getaldić-Gundulić (1833–1899), soldier, statesman, nobleman, Knight of Malta.
 Nikša Gradi (1825–1894), Croatian lawyer and writer.
 Ignjat Job (1895–1936), Croatian painter.
  (1883–1955), Croatian writer, collector and culture worker.
 Antun Paško Kazali (1815–1894), Catholic priest and writer.
 Miho Klaić (1829–1896), Croatian politician.
 Stijepo Kobasica (1882–1944), journalist, author and politician.
 Eduard Miloslavić (1884–1952), Croatian scientist.
 Marko Murat (1864–1944), painter.
 Vlaho Paljetak (1893–1944), Croatian composer.
 Medo Pucić (1821–1882), writer and politician.
 Niko Pucić (1820–1883), politician and nobleman.
 Milan Rešetar (1860–1942), linguist and historian.
 Federico Seismit-Doda (1825–1893), Italian politician.
 Ivan Stojanović (1829–1900), priest and writer.
 Frano Supilo (1870–1917), Croatian politician, journalist and publicist.
 Mato Vodopić (1816–1893), bishop of Dubrovnik and poet.
 Ivo Vojnović (1857–1929), writer.

20th century

 Banu Alkan (born 1958), Turkish-Croatian actress.
 Ivo Banac (born 1947), Croatian historian and politician, professor at Yale University.
 Branko Bauer (1921–2002), Croatian film director.
 Ivo Grbić (1931–2020), Croatian artist.
 Veselin Đuho (born 1960), Croatian water polo player and coach, Olympic gold medallist.
 Elvis Fatović (born 1971), Croatian water polo player and coach, European and world gold medallist.
 Sanja Jovanović (born 1986), Olympic swimmer.
 Tereza Kesovija (born 1938), Croatian singer.
 Mario Kopić (born 1965), Croatian philosopher.
 Srđan Lakić (born 1983), Croatian football player.
 Milan Milišić (1941–1991), poet and playwright.
 Ottavio Missoni (1921–2013), Italian-Croatian fashion designer.
 Tias Mortigjija (1913–1944), Croatian journalist, publicist, and member.
 Mihovil Španja (born 1984), Croatian Paralympic swimmer.
 Dubravka Šuica (born 1957), Croatian politician.
 Goran Sukno (born 1959), Croatian water polo player, Olympic gold medallist.
 Slaven Tolj (born 1964), Croatian artist.
 Ante Tomić (born 1987), basketball player.
 Sonja Tomić (born 1947), writer, translator, illustrator, croatist, Germanist and radio presenter.
 Antun Vujić (born 1945), Croatian politician and philosopher.
 Božo Vuletić (born 1958), Croatian water polo player, Olympic gold medallist.
 Ibrica Jusić (born 1944), Croatian musician.
 Milo Hrnić (born 1950), Croatian pop singer.
 Đelo Jusić (born 1939), Croatian composer, arranger, conductor and guitarist.
 Ibrica Jusić (born 1944), Bosnian-Croatian chanson, folk, pop and sevdalinka singer-songwriter and musician.
 Matko Obradović (born 1991), Croatian footballer and goalkeeper.
 Nina Obuljen Koržinek (born 1970), Croatian violinist and political scientist.
 Andro Knego (born 1956), Croatian basketball player.
 Vlatko Kovačević (born 1942), Croatian grandmaster of chess.
  (born 1936), Croatian politician.
  (1931–1997), Cartographer.
 Darko Miladin (born 1979), Croatian football player.
  (born 1943), author.
  (1929–1999), General.
 Ana Konjuh (born 1997), Croatian tennis player.
 Tonči Zonjić (born 1986), Croatian comic book artist.

See also
List of Ragusans

Dubrovnik
People From Dubrovnik